The 1989 Cheltenham Gold Cup was a horse race which took place at Cheltenham on Thursday 16 March 1989. It was the 62nd running of the Cheltenham Gold Cup, and it was won by the pre-race favourite Desert Orchid. The winner was ridden by Simon Sherwood and trained by David Elsworth.

The race was later voted the "Greatest Race of All Time" in a Racing Post poll, ahead of the 1973 Grand National and the 1975 King George VI and Queen Elizabeth Stakes.

Race details
 Sponsor: Tote
 Winner's prize money: £66,635.00
 Going: Heavy
 Number of runners: 13
 Winner's time: 7m 17.6s

Full result

* The distances between the horses are shown in lengths or shorter. Ref = refused; PU = pulled-up; BD = brought down.† Trainers are based in Great Britain unless indicated.

Winner's details
Further details of the winner, Desert Orchid:

 Foaled: 11 April 1979 in Great Britain
 Sire: Grey Mirage; Dam: Flower Child (Brother)
 Owner: Richard Burridge
 Breeder: James Burridge

References

 
 news.google.co.uk/newspapers – Glasgow Herald – 22 March 1989.

Cheltenham Gold Cup
 1989
Cheltenham Gold Cup
Cheltenham Gold Cup
1980s in Gloucestershire